Mozzo is a comune (municipality) in the Province of Bergamo in the Italian region of Lombardy, located about  northeast of Milan and about  west of Bergamo. 

The municipality of Mozzo contains the frazioni (subdivisions, mainly villages and hamlets) Borghetto, Ca' del Lupo, Colombera, Crocette, Dorotina, Merena, Mozzo di Sopra, and Pascoletto.

Mozzo borders the following municipalities: Bergamo, Curno, Ponte San Pietro, Valbrembo. Part of Mozzo's territory is part of Parco dei Colli di Bergamo.

Economy
Mozzo was the birthplace for the multinational chemical company Sigma. In 1958, it produced surfactants used in the textile industry.

References

External links
 Official website